Diogo Villarinho (born 11 March 1994) is a Brazilian swimmer, who specialized in open water marathon.

Career
At the 2013 World Aquatics Championships, in Barcelona, he finished 15th in the Men's 25 km, and 52nd in the Men's 10 km race.

At the 2014 South American Games, in Santiago, he won a gold medal in the Team's 3 km, and finished 4th in the Men's 10km.

At the 2015 FINA World Championships in Kazan, he finished 21st in the 10 km marathon. Three days later, he won the silver medal in the Mixed 5km Team Event. On August 1, he finished 18th in the 25 km marathon.

At the 2019 World Aquatics Championships in Gwangju, South Korea, he finished 4th in the Open water swimming Team, 36th in the Men's 5 km marathon, and 22nd in the Men's 1500 metre freestyle.

At the 2019 Pan American Games held in Lima, Peru, he finished 6th in the Men's 800 metre freestyle and in the Men's 1500 metre freestyle.

References

1994 births
Living people
Brazilian male long-distance swimmers
Sportspeople from Goiânia
World Aquatics Championships medalists in open water swimming
South American Games gold medalists for Brazil
South American Games medalists in swimming
Competitors at the 2014 South American Games
Swimmers at the 2019 Pan American Games
Pan American Games competitors for Brazil